"I Just Don't Have the Heart" is a song by British singer Cliff Richard, released as the second single from his 1989 album Stronger. It was written and produced by Stock Aitken Waterman and became another UK top 10 hit for him, peaking at No. 3.

Critical reception
David Giles of Music Week gave a negative review of "I Just Don't Have the Heart", saying: "Cliff crashes to earth with a bump and teams up with SAW. The result is a standard SAW somp, putting one of pop's great legends on a level with Sonia". A review of Richard's Stronger in the same magazine considered the song as the "worst" track of the album and a "SAW abberation". More positively, before releasing his 100th single, Richard invited 2,000 British fans to the London Palladium for a preview of six songs from his album Stronger to choose the one they liked the most as the possible 100th single, and "I Just Don't Have the Heart" ranked at the third position.

Track listing
UK single
"I Just Don't Have the Heart" (3:27)
"Wide Open Space" (4:38)
"I Just Don't Have the Heart" [Instrumental] (4:00)

12" single (12 EMP 101)
"I Just Don't Have the Heart" (Extended Version) (5:54)
"Wide Open Space" (4:38)
"I Just Don't Have the Heart" (4:00)

Charts

Weekly charts

Year-end charts

References

1989 songs
1989 singles
Cliff Richard songs
Songs written by Mike Stock (musician)
Songs written by Matt Aitken
Songs written by Pete Waterman
Song recordings produced by Stock Aitken Waterman
EMI Records singles